Crocus scharojanii is a species of flowering plant in the genus Crocus of the family Iridaceae, found from Northeastern Turkey to Caucasus.

References

scharojanii
Plants described in 1868